United Nations Security Council resolution 857, adopted unanimously on 20 August 1993, after recalling 808 (1993) and 827 (1993) and considering the nominations for Judges of the International Criminal Tribunal for the former Yugoslavia received by the Secretary-General Boutros Boutros-Ghali before 16 August 1993, the council established a list of candidates in accordance with Article 13 of the Statute of the International Tribunal.

The list of nominations was as follows:

Georges Michel Abi-Saab (Egypt)
Julio A. Barberis (Argentina)
Raphael Barras (Switzerland)
Sikhe Camara (Guinea)
Antonio Cassese (Italy)
Hans Axel Valdemar Corell (Sweden)
Jules Deschênes (Canada)
Alfonso De Los Heros (Peru)
Jerzy Jasinski (Poland)
Heike Jung (Germany)
Adolphus Godwin Karibi-Whyte (Nigeria)
Valentin G. Kisilev (Russian Federation)
Germain Le Foyer De Costil (France)
Li Haopei (China)
Gabrielle Kirk McDonald (United States)
Amadou N'Diaye (Mali)
Daniel David Ntanda Nsereko (Uganda)
Elizabeth Odio Benito (Costa Rica)
Huseyin Pazarci (Turkey)
Moragodage Christopher Walter Pinto (Sri Lanka)
Rustam S. Sidhwa (Pakistan)
Ninian Stephen (Australia)
Lal Chan Vohrah (Malaysia)

See also
 Bosnian War
 Breakup of Yugoslavia
 Croatian War of Independence
 List of United Nations Security Council Resolutions 801 to 900 (1993–1994)
 Yugoslav Wars

References

External links
 
Text of the Resolution at undocs.org

 0857
 0857
1993 in Yugoslavia
1993 in Bosnia and Herzegovina
1993 in Croatia
 0857
August 1993 events